1998–99 Hong Kong FA Cup was the 24th staging of the Hong Kong FA Cup. 

It was competed by all of the 8 teams from Hong Kong First Division League. The competition kicked off on 29 April 1999 and finished on 25 May with the final.

South China won the cup for the seventh time after beating Instant-Dict 1-0 in the final.

Fixtures and results

Bracket

Final

References

Hong Kong FA Cup
Hong Kong Fa Cup
Fa Cup